Johnstons Creek, formerly Johnston's Creek, is an urban gully, located in Sydney, Australia and situated in the  Leichhardt local government area. The creek flows from Petersham, past Annandale, Camperdown, Forest Lodge and Harold Park, before spilling into Rozelle Bay, within Sydney Harbour.

Course and features
Originally a natural watercourse, Johnston's Creek was converted into a brick and concrete channel in the 1890s in order to improve sanitation in Sydney. The creek rises in Petersham and initially marked the eastern boundary of the land granted to Lieutenant-Colonel George Johnston in the 1790s, which he named Annandale. The Annandale Estate was subdivided in the latter part of the 19th Century into what is now the suburbs of Stanmore and Annandale. The channel now forms a boundary of Annandale, Forest Lodge, Camperdown and Stanmore.

Johnstons Creek has one minor tributary, Orphan School Creek, an urban canal that joins Johnstons Creek at Forest Lodge.

Urban structures
Johnstons Creek is crossed by the Annandale Bridge on Parramatta Road, and road bridges at Booth Street and The Crescent. The heritage-listed Allan Truss Bridge, formerly the Federal Road Bridge, crosses Johnstons Creek near its mouth, connecting Annandale and Glebe. The bridge was decommissioned for road usage and converted as a footbridge in 2000. A small pedestrian and road bridge crosses the canal at Harold Park, and a former tram bridge provides a direct route from Minogue Crescent to Hogan and Spindler Park. The Bowstring Bridge, a footbridge, is an early example of reinforced concrete bowstring arch bridges built in Australia, located on Minogue Crescent, Forest Lodge.

A heavy rail viaduct, now used for the Inner West Light Rail, crosses the creek between Jubilee Park and Federal Park, west of Glebe.

Completed in 1898, the Johnston's Creek Sewer Aqueduct connects Sydney's western suburbs to the Northern Main Sewer extension of the Bondi Ocean Outfall Sewer, managed by Sydney Water. The Johnston's and White's Creek Aqueducts, both listed on the Register of the National Estate, were the first reinforced concrete structures in Australia.

A salt marsh wetland was constructed in 2001 to filter storm water before it enters Sydney Harbour via Johnston's Creek.

In 2020 Sydney Water started a major project to naturalise the creek from The Crescent to the mouth at Rozelle Bay.

Marine life
The shark was last seen swimming along the Glebe foreshore in the direction of the Anzac Bridge.

Independence Movement 

In early 2019, a small group of people established an organisation named the Johnston's Creek Liberation Army, laying the claim that Johnston's Creek has 'a unique and distinct cultural identity separate from the rest of Australia'. The group is advocating for the creation of a new state within the commonwealth or separate nation entirely that would better represent the people of Johnston's Creek. 

In the later months of 2020, the Johnston's Creek Liberation Army released via a post on Instagram their demands, which are:

 The recognition of the unique cultural identity of the area
 The establishment of a new independent nation, called the Republic of Johnston's Creek
 The end of Australian government 'intervention and oppression' in the area

The Johnston's Creek Liberation Army has stated that if those demands are not met by 2025, the group will commence a 'violent revolutionary warfare campaign'.

Opposition 
There has been some level of opposition to the claims made by the Johnston's Creek Liberation Army, mainly by a local man known as 'Japitty Cumquat', who has publicly denounced the demands and statements made by the group.

See also

Whites Creek
Glebe and Wentworth Park railway viaducts

References

External links
Johnstons Creek Stormwater Channel Exhibition)

Creeks and canals of Sydney
Inner West